Pultenaea cinerascens is a species of flowering plant in the family Fabaceae and is endemic to central New South Wales. It is an erect to spreading shrub with narrow oblong to wedge-shaped leaves, and groups of yellow and red flowers.

Description
Pultenaea cinerascens is an erect to spreading shrub with softly-hairy branches.

Taxonomy and naming
Pultenaea cinerascens was first formally described in 1905 by Joseph Maiden and Ernst Betche in the Proceedings of the Linnean Society of New South Wales from specimens collected near Warialda by John Luke Boorman in 1905. The specific epithet (cinerascens) means "becoming ash-grey".

Distribution and habitat
This pultenaea grows in forest on sandstone between Coolatai and Parkes in central New South Wales.

References

cinerascens
Flora of New South Wales
Plants described in 1905
Taxa named by Joseph Maiden
Taxa named by Ernst Betche